Pop music in Hong Kong may refer to:

 Cantopop music in Hong Kong
 Mandopop music in Hong Kong
 Hong Kong English pop music